Blood is a 2021 studio album by American alternative rock musician Juliana Hatfield. The album was recorded by Hatfield in her home during the COVID-19 pandemic, with subsequent studio overdubs and mixing and focuses on themes of violence and retribution. The release was preceded by the single "Mouthful of Blood".

Critical reception
Frankie Valish of Under the Radar rated this release a seven out of 10, citing the violent themes, some "perfectly jarring" music, and calling this "one of Hatfield's most experimental albums in years". Writing for PopMatters, Ian Rushbury scored this album a six out of 10, noting that Hatfield has relied on collaborators to make music in the past, and this album relies too much on her solo effort, leading to an album collection where "she’s forgotten to pack enough decent tunes". The editorial board of AllMusic Guide scored Blood four out of five stars, calling it the Best of 2021, with reviewer Stephen Thomas Erlewine praising the home recording approach, as well as Hatfield's varied sounds and emotions on the recording, resulting in a tension that "isn't merely provocative" but also "nourishing". Erin Osmon interviewed Hatfield for The Guardian and characterized Blood as full of "complex emotions [turned] into tuneful, three-minute vignettes", calling it an excellent album.

Track listing
All songs written by Juliana Hatfield, except where noted
"The Shame of Love" (Jed Davis) – 4:48
"Gorgon" – 3:47
"Nightmary" – 2:54
"Had a Dream" – 2:56
"Splinter" – 2:58
"Suck It Up" (Davis) – 3:10
"Chunks" – 3:05
"Mouthful of Blood" – 3:07
"Dead Weight" – 3:33
"Torture" – 3:08

Personnel
Credits adapted from Blood liner notes

Juliana Hatfield – guitar, vocals, illustrations, photography
James Bridges – overdubs, engineering, mixing
Jed Davis – recording, design, layout
Sean Glonek – mastering

See also
List of 2021 albums (January–June)

References

External links

Aggregate reviews from Album of the Year
Review from Slug Mag

2021 albums
American Laundromat Records albums
Juliana Hatfield albums